Cellular nucleic acid-binding protein is a protein that in humans is encoded by the CNBP gene.

Function 

The ZNF9 protein contains 7 zinc finger domains and is believed to function as an RNA-binding protein. A CCTG expansion in intron 1 of the ZNF9 gene results in myotonic dystrophy type 2 (MIM 602668).[supplied by OMIM]

References

Further reading

External links 
  GeneReviews/NCBI/NIH/UW entry on Myotonic Dystrophy Type 2
 
 

Transcription factors